The Clearwater School is an independent school in Bothell, Washington, a northern suburb of Seattle, Washington, United States.
Clearwater is a Sudbury school that serves students from ages 4 to 19.

The school began in 1996 as a twice-weekly homeschool cooperative, and opened as a full-time school in 1999. In 2006 the school moved to its current campus in Bothell.

Philosophy

Clearwater is a democratic school where students create the rules and policies that affect the entire school.
The educational philosophy is similar to unschooling in that student-chosen activities are the primary means of learning.

Curriculum

Clearwater students explore their own interests at their own pace.
Students are not segregated by age and are free to determine how they spend their time.
The school has no assignments, no grades, and no classes unless students organize them.

Facilities

The school's campus consists of five buildings on 3.4 acres and includes a kitchen, an art room, a music room, a theater, a computer room, an office, a library, an active room, and quiet areas. The school also has a play yard, and North Creek flows through the campus.

The school has an ongoing partnership with Snohomish County for ecological restoration of North Creek for salmon and other wildlife.

The campus generates solar energy using a photovoltaic system
as part of the school's commitment to sustainable practices.

Government

The democratic structure of the school gives students a direct say in how the school is managed. Students and staff members each have a vote in School Meeting, where rules and policies are created, and in Judicial Committee, where rules are enforced.

Staff

The adults at Clearwater are called staff, to distinguish their role from the role of traditional teachers.
Staff members do not tell students how they should spend their time; instead they play, encourage, and learn alongside students.

See also
List of democratic schools
Democratic education
Education reform

References

External links
 The Clearwater School
 The Clearwater School profile at greatschools.org

Educational institutions established in 1996
Private elementary schools in Washington (state)
Private middle schools in Washington (state)
Private high schools in Washington (state)
Schools in Snohomish County, Washington
Schools in Bothell, Washington
1996 establishments in Washington (state)